The 1970 NCAA University Division Men's Cross Country Championships were the 32nd annual cross country meet to determine the team and individual national champions of men's collegiate cross country running in the United States. Held on November 23, 1970, the meet was hosted by the College of William & Mary on the grounds of the Eastern State Hospital in Williamsburg, Virginia. The distance for this race was 6 miles (9.7 kilometers).

All NCAA University Division members were eligible to qualify for the meet. In total, 39 teams and 307 individual runners contested this championship.

The team national championship was again won by the Villanova Wildcats, their fourth title. The individual championship was won by Steve Prefontaine, from Oregon, with a time of 28:00.02. Prefontaine's time broke the event distance record, set the previous year by Gerry Lindgren. With the distance for the NCAA championships changing to 10,000 meters in 1976, his distance record would remain unbroken.

Men's title
Distance: 6 miles (9.7 kilometers)

Team Result (Top 10)

See also
NCAA Men's Division II Cross Country Championship

References
 

NCAA Cross Country Championships
NCAA University Division Cross Country Championships
NCAA Division I Cross Country Championships
NCAA Division I Cross Country Championships
Williamsburg, Virginia
Track and field in Virginia
William & Mary Tribe cross country